Orizont is a 2015 Romanian drama film written and directed by , adapted from the novella  by Ioan Slavici.

Plot

Cast
 András Hatházi - Lucian
  - Andra
 Bogdán Zsolt - Zoli
  - Pintea
  - Adi
 Maria Seleș - Victoria
 Elena Purea - Procuror
 Mihai Dorobanțu - Senatorul
 Dan Rădulescu - Judecătorul
 Costin Gavaza - Avocat
 Radu Ciobanașu - Polițist
 Dorin C. Zachei - Petrecăreț 1
 Fărcuț Ghiță Daniel - Petrecăreț 2
 Krisztina Bíró - Petrecăreață 1
 Lucian Diaconu - Petrecăreț 3
 Dana Diaconu - Petrecăreață 2

See also
 Romanian New Wave
 Cinema of Romania
 The Mill of Good Luck (1955)

References

External links
 

2015 films
Romanian thriller drama films
2010s Romanian-language films
2015 thriller drama films
2015 drama films